mRNA-5671 also known as V941 is a cancer vaccine candidate developed by Moderna. It is a tetravalent vaccine that targets G12D, G12V, G13D or G12C driver mutations in the KRAS gene. It is currently being evaluated for the treatment of either non-small cell lung cancer,  colorectal cancers with microsatellite instability, or pancreatic adenocarcinoma, all with confirmed KRAS driver mutations.

References 

Cancer vaccines
RNA vaccines